Gorgyra warreni is a butterfly in the family Hesperiidae. It is found in Cameroon and Nigeria.

References

Butterflies described in 2008
Erionotini